Palaemonetes paludosus, known as ghost shrimp, glass shrimp, and eastern grass shrimp, is a species of freshwater shrimp from the southeastern United States.

Description
By manipulating the pigment granules in its body, it can produce effective camouflage against its background. It is very similar to P. kadiakensis, from which it can be distinguished by the arrangement of spines on the telson.

Distribution
Palaemonetes paludosus is common in southern states east of the Appalachian Mountains. It is also found in Louisiana, where it may not be native, and there are scattered records from further west, in Texas and California. Their distribution is due to decreased susceptibility to predation because of complexity in higher habitats in Polygonum beds

Ecology
Palaemonetes paludosus lives in fresh water or slightly brackish water, usually in lakes. It is nocturnal, remaining hidden among the vegetation by day, and emerging at night to feed on plankton. It is an important prey item for a number of birds and fishes, and may be considered a keystone species.

References

External links

Palaemonidae
Freshwater crustaceans of North America
Crustaceans described in 1850